Jim Shelley may refer to:

 Jim Shelley (musician) (born 1952), American singer-songwriter
 Jim Shelley (TV critic), British television critic